The 1965–66 South-West Indian Ocean cyclone season  was a near average season, despite beginning unusually early on August 9 with the formation of an early-season tropical depression, Anne.



Seasonal summary

Systems

Tropical Disturbance Anne
Anne existed on August 15.

Tropical Disturbance Brenda
Brenda existed from August 16 to August 18.

Severe Tropical Storm Claude
Claude existed from December 24 to January 10.

Tropical Cyclone Denise
Later, the storm crossed over Réunion, dropping record rainfall. Over a 24-hour period, Denise dropped  of rainfall at Foc Foc, Réunion, of which  fell over 12 hours; both precipitation totals are the highest recorded worldwide for their respective durations. Over 48 hours, precipitation totaled  at Bras Sec. The heavy rains caused flooding that killed three people, and caused severe road and crop damage.

Tropical Depression Evelyn
Evelyn existed from January 19 to January 20.

Tropical Depression Francine
Francine existed from January 30 to February 1.

Tropical Depression Germaine
Germaine existed from February 14 to February 17.

Tropical Depression Hilary
Hilary existed from February 20 to February 23.

Intense Tropical Cyclone Ivy
Ivy existed from March 3 to March 12.

Tropical Depression Martha–Judith
Judith was the tenth cyclone of the season and was formed in the Australian basin on February 23.

Tropical Cyclone Nancy–Kay

Tropical Depression Lily
Lily existed from April 22 to May 1.

See also

 Atlantic hurricane seasons: 1965, 1966
 Eastern Pacific hurricane seasons: 1965, 1966
 Western Pacific typhoon seasons: 1965, 1966
 North Indian Ocean cyclone seasons: 1965, 1966

References

South-West Indian Ocean cyclone seasons